Samuel Chamberlain Koch (January 3, 1955 – July 20, 2014) was an American soccer coach. He served as the head coach for the Stanford Cardinal men's soccer team from 1984 to 1989, and for the UMass Minutemen men's soccer team from 1991 to 2013.

Coaching career
Koch started his coaching career as an assistant at Brown University and Boston College.  From 1984 to 1989, he served as the head coach for the Stanford Cardinal men's soccer team, with a record of 58-53-16.  From 1991 to 2013, he served as the head coach of the UMass Minutemen men's soccer team, with a record of 222-182-45. He led his team to the NCAA tournament three times (2001, 2007 and 2008), including an appearance in the NCAA College Cup Semifinals in 2007. At the end of his tenure at UMass, he was UMass's "winningest men's soccer coach" with a total of 222 career wins.

Personal life
Koch was born to Albert Carl Koch Jr. and Frances Jean Emery Koch in Boston, Massachusetts on January 3, 1955.  He attended Concord-Carlisle High School and Northfield Mount Hermon School.  After high school, he attended Colby College, where he played on the varsity soccer team, and graduated in 1979 with degrees in History and Environmental Studies.  His support of Colby soccer was honored with the creation of the "Sam Koch Award" at Colby College.  He was married to Suzanne Patterson, with whom he had four children. He died of sinus cancer on July 20, 2014 at his home in Hadley, Massachusetts.

References

External links

1955 births
2014 deaths
UMass Minutemen soccer coaches
Stanford Cardinal men's soccer coaches
Colby College alumni
Deaths from cancer in Massachusetts
American soccer coaches
Soccer players from Boston
Sportspeople from Boston
College men's soccer players in the United States
Brown Bears men's soccer coaches
Boston College Eagles men's soccer coaches
Association footballers not categorized by position
Association football players not categorized by nationality